The Western Illinois Leathernecks women's basketball team represents Western Illinois University of Macomb, Illinois, in NCAA Division I women's college basketball competition. The school's team currently competes in the Summit League.

History
In their first NCAA Tournament appearance in 1995, they lost to North Carolina 89–48. They made appearances in the WNIT in 2003 and 2006 along with an appearance in the WBI in 2016.

Western Illinois were 2016–17 Summit League Champions.

March 28 is WIU Leatherneck Women's Basketball Day in Macomb, Illinois. The team was recognized for their 2016–2017 record where they finished 26–7 in the Summit League and advancing to the NCAA tournament.

2017 Summit League Tournament 
Western Illinois was the Number 1 seed in the tournament. They won the Summit League Tournament on March 7, 2017, with a 77–69 overtime win defeating IUPUI. The win sends the Leatherneck's to the NCAA Tournament, their first appearance since 1995. The win was WIU's 11th consecutive of the season, tying the team record set in 1995.

Both Morgan Blumer and Emily Clemens were named to the All-Tournament League, with Clemens being named tournament MVP.

NCAA tournament results

References

External links